Evgeni Alexandrovich Koroliov (born 1 October 1949, in Moscow) is a Russian classical pianist.

Koroliov studied at the Moscow Conservatory. Since 1978 he has been a teacher at the Hochschule für Musik und Theater Hamburg. He lives in Hamburg with his wife Ljupka Hadzigeorgieva. Together they also form a musical duo („Duo Koroliov“).

He is mainly associated with the keyboard repertoire of J.S. Bach (the complete Well-Tempered Clavier and Art of Fugue i.a.), but he is also known for his performances of Haydn, Beethoven, Chopin, Debussy, some Mozart and Schumann, and contemporary works like those of Shostakovich.

References

External links 
 Evgeni Koroliov website

1949 births
Living people
Russian classical pianists
Male classical pianists
21st-century classical pianists
21st-century Russian male musicians